Archibald Primrose may refer to:
 Archibald Primrose, 1st Laird of Burnbrae (c.1538–?)
 Archibald Primrose, Lord Carrington (1616–1679), notable Scottish lawyer, judge, and Cavalier
 Archibald Primrose, 2nd Viscount of Primrose (died 1716), Viscount of Primrose
 Archibald Primrose, 1st Earl of Rosebery (1661–1723), Scottish politician
 Archibald Primrose, 4th Earl of Rosebery (1783–1868), British politician
 Archibald Primrose, 5th Earl of Rosebery (1847–1929), Prime Minister of the United Kingdom
 Archibald Primrose, Lord Dalmeny (1809–1851), Scottish Liberal politician

See also
 Earl of Rosebery